The Gardner equation is an integrable nonlinear partial differential equation introduced by the mathematician Clifford Gardner in 1968 to generalize KdV equation and modified KdV equation. The Gardner equation has applications in hydrodynamics, plasma physics and quantum field theory

 

References

Graham W. Griffiths William E. Shiesser, Traveling Wave Analysis of Partial Differential Equations, Academy Press
 Richard H. Enns George C. McCGuire, Nonlinear Physics, Birkhauser,1997
Inna Shingareva, Carlos Lizárraga-Celaya, Solving Nonlinear Partial Differential Equations with Maple, Springer.
Eryk Infeld and George Rowlands, Nonlinear Waves, Solitons and Chaos, Cambridge 2000
Saber Elaydi, An Introduction to Difference Equations, Springer 2000
Dongming Wang, Elimination Practice, Imperial College Press 2004
 David Betounes, Partial Differential Equations for Computational Science: With Maple and Vector Analysis. Springer, 1998 
 George Articolo, Partial Differential Equations & Boundary Value Problems with Maple V, Academic Press 1998 

Nonlinear partial differential equations
Integrable systems